Guayaguayare is the southeasternmost village in Trinidad & Tobago. It lies at the southern end of the county of Mayaro. Guayaguayare (often simply called Guaya) is primarily a fishing village, but it also plays a major role in the petroleum industry. The largest petroleum producers in the country - BP Trinidad & Tobago (bpTT), BHP and Petrotrin all have major presences here and bpTT controls the Port of Guayaguayare, which services most of the offshore petroleum production in Trinidad.  The major natural gas pipelines, serving Atlantic LNG in Point Fortin and the Point Lisas Industrial Estate, come ashore here.

Guayaguayare was the first area in Trinidad sighted by Christopher Columbus on July 31, 1498.  The area along Guayaguayare Bay, between the Lizard River (originally Rio de Iguanas) and the Pilote River (Rio de Pilotas) was settled by French planters and their slaves in the late eighteenth century following the 1783 Cedula de Población.

Guayaguayare also has a prominent place in the history of the oil industry - it was the site of the first commercially viable wells drilled in Trinidad by Randolph Rust and Lee Lum in May 1902.

It is the birthplace of Jillian Richardson who won a silver medal for Canada at the 1984 Olympics in the 4x400 metres.

References

Populated places in Trinidad and Tobago
Ports and harbours of Trinidad and Tobago